Drosera sargentii is a species of pygmy sundew from Western Australia.

Carnivorous plants of Australia
sargentii
Caryophyllales of Australia